was one of the primary castles of Oda Nobunaga located in the Azuchi neighborhood of the city of Ōmihachiman, Shiga Prefecture. The site of the castle was designated a National Historic Site in 1926, with the designation upgraded to that of a Special National Historic Site in 1952. The castle is located within the grounds of the Biwako Quasi-National Park.

Azuchi Castle was built from 1576 to 1579 on Mount Azuchi on the eastern shore of Lake Biwa in Ōmi Province. Nobunaga intentionally built Azuchi Castle close enough to Kyoto that he could watch over and guard the approaches to the capital, but outside Kyoto so his fortress would be immune to the fires and conflicts that occasionally consumed the city. Azuchi Castle's location was also strategically advantageous in managing the communications and transportation routes between Nobunaga's greatest foes – the Uesugi to the north, the Takeda in the east, and the Mōri to the west. Azuchi Castle was demolished in 1582 by Akechi Mitsuhide after his assassination of Nobunaga in the Honno-ji Incident.

The Azuchi-Momoyama period of Japanese history partially takes its name from Azuchi Castle.

History
Niwa Nagahide had responsibility for constructing the castle, which began in 1576 and completed in 1579.

Unlike earlier castles and fortresses, Azuchi was not intended to be a military structure alone, cold, dark, and foreboding. Nobunaga intended it as a mansion which would impress and intimidate his rivals not only with its defenses, but also with its lavish apartments and decorations, flourishing town, and religious life. The keep, called tenshu (or tenshukaku), rather than being the center of the castle's defences, was a seven-story building containing audience halls, private chambers, offices, and a treasury, as though it were a royal palace.  All seven stories were decorated by Kanō Eitoku.

In addition to being one of the first Japanese castles with a tower keep, Azuchi was unique in that its uppermost story was octagonal. In addition, the facade of Azuchi, unlike the solid white or black of other castles, was colorfully decorated with tigers and dragons.

There were five main militaristic features of Azuchi Castle that differentiated it from earlier castle designs. Firstly, it was a massive structure, with the walls of the castle ranging from 5.5 to 6.5 meters in thickness. The second feature of Azuchi Castle is the predominant use of stone. The walls were constructed from huge granite stones fitted carefully together without the use of mortar. A third innovation of the Azuchi Castle was the high central tower, or donjon. The tower allowed for increased visibility for the use of guns against an opposing force. Builder’s plans for the castle show the donjon to be 40 meters, with seven levels. Fourthly, Azuchi Castle had irregularly formed inner citadels. These inner citadels gave defenders ample defensive positions against intruders.

Nobunaga chose Azuchi-yama for the location of Azuchi Castle, which rises 100 meters above Lake Biwa.  The site was strategically placed at the intersection of three highways converging on Kyoto from the east.

Nobunaga desired a full castle town, and built well-defended homes for his generals, a Jōdo-shū Buddhist temple called Jōgon-in, and a number of homes for commoners a short distance away on the shore of the lake. He had trouble convincing people to move into these homes at first, however. In the summer of 1577, he issued a municipal charter, guaranteeing residents immunity from taxes, building or transport levies, and moratoria, and forced all travelers on the Nakasendō highway to stop in the town overnight for lodging, thus bringing business to his town's innkeepers. By 1582, the town's inhabitants numbered roughly 5,000.

In addition to welcoming many of Nobunaga's powerful political guests, such as Tokugawa Ieyasu and Niwa Nagahide, Azuchi castle also hosted an event in 1579 which has come to be known as the Azuchi religious debate (安土宗論, Azuchi shūron), taking place between leaders of the Nichiren and Jōdo-shū sects of Buddhism.

In the summer of 1582, just after Nobunaga's death at Honnō-ji, the castle was taken over by the forces of Akechi Mitsuhide, Nobunaga's betrayer. The castle was set aflame a week or so later, with some accounts claiming this might have been the work of looting townspeople, or of one of Nobunaga's sons.

Architecture and design
In 1976, the Japanese architectural historian Akira Naitō published what he believed to be a conclusive summary of the features of Azuchi Castle. He concluded that the tenshu was 46 meters in height, with a gilded octagonal belvedere on top.  An atrium rose from the basement level to the fourth floor ceiling, supposedly influenced by the Jesuits, but with a stupa at the atrium floor center. However, the external design of Azuchi Castle is still debated. Another Japanese Architectural Historian, Miyakami Shigetaka, has accused Naitō of failing to corroborate his theory with enough documentation.

Azuchi screens
The Azuchi Screens are a set of six-folding screens depicting Azuchi Castle and its nearby town. Oda Nobunaga gifted them to Pope Gregory XIII, who displayed them in the Vatican collections, where they were admired by visitors. However, they disappeared from historical record. Their fate is unknown and they are considered to be lost. The screens must have been pivotal works in the development of Japanese folding screens.

Modern times
All that remains of the castle today is the stone base. However, an approximate reproduction of Azuchi, based on illustrations and historical descriptions, stands in Ise Sengoku Village, a samurai theme park near Ise. In addition, a full-scale replica of the top floors of the donjon is on display at the Nobunaga no Yakata Museum near the original castle ruins.

Azuchi Castle was listed as one of Japan's Top 100 Castles by the Japan Castle Foundation in 2006.

See also
List of Special Places of Scenic Beauty, Special Historic Sites and Special Natural Monuments
Golden Tea Room

References

Further reading

Elison, George and Smith, Bardwell L. (eds) (1987). "Warlords, Artist, & Commoners." Honolulu: University Press of Hawaii.
Erdmann, Mark Karl (2016). "Azuchi Castle: Architectural Innovation and Political Legitimacy in Sixteenth-Century Japan". Doctoral dissertation, Harvard University, Graduate School of Arts & Sciences. 
Turnbull, Stephen (2003). "Japanese Castles 1540-1640." Oxford: Osprey Publishing.

External links 

Nobunaga no Yakata Museum
Azuchi Castle (moving image)
NOBUNAKAOU reporter
Photos and models of Azuchi castle

Houses completed in 1579
Castles in Shiga Prefecture
100 Fine Castles of Japan
Former castles in Japan
1570s establishments in Japan
Special Historic Sites
Ruined castles in Japan
Ōmihachiman, Shiga